Ligist is a municipality in the district of Voitsberg in the Austrian state of Styria.

Geography
Ligist lies in the west Styrian foothills.

References

Cities and towns in Voitsberg District